Emerald Cave may refer to:
Grotta dello Smeraldo in Italy
Emerald Cave (Thailand) in Thailand